Ashiq Usman is an Indian film producer and actor who works in Malayalam films. He also acted in Malayalam films as child artist. He launched Ashiq Usman Productions in 2012,  As a producer his debut was Arikil Oraal which starred Indrajith Sukumaran, Remya Nambeesan, and Nivin Pauly. He was the producer of the blockbuster movie Anjaam Pathiraa, starring Kunchacko Boban. He is remaking the Malayalam movie Anjaam Pathiraa in Hindi language in association with Reliance Entertainment. His latest movie to hit theaters is Thallumaala starring Tovino Thomas and directed by Khalid Rahman.

Early life
He was born at Ernakulam on 17 April 1986 at Ernakulam, India. He completed his  secondary schooling at Seventh Day Adventist Higher Secondary School and passed senior secondary from Sacred Heart Thevara and He graduated from CUSAT. He married Khadeeja Ashraf in 2014 and have two kids.

Filmography

References

External links
 

1986 births
Living people
Malayali people
Film producers from Kochi
People from Ernakulam district
Malayalam film producers
Businesspeople from Kochi